The Women's 40 kg powerlifting event at the 2004 Summer Paralympics was competed  on 20 September. It was won by Lidiya Solovyova, representing .

Final round

20 Sept. 2004, 16:30

References

W
Para